A salsabil (or salasabil), also known as a shadirwan, is a type of fountain which maximizes the surface area of the water. It is used for evaporative cooling of buildings, cooling and aeration of drinking water, and ornament (it has also been used to prevent eavesdropping). The water may flow in a thin sheet or thin streams, often over a wavy surface with many little waterfalls. Its use extends from southern Spain through north Africa and the Middle East to northern India.

Etymology and name 
The name salsabil likely derives from a Qur'anic reference. The term shadirwan is also used for devices for aerating drinking water. However, the term shadirwan or shadirvan has slightly different uses in other cultures, such as designating a central ablutions fountain for a mosque courtyard in Turkish (see shadirvan).

Design and setting
The water flows in a manner designed to maximize the surface area, and thus evaporation. A salsabil may be a near-vertical marble waterfall mounted on a wall, or the sheet of water may flow down a slanted chute. 

Evaporative cooling causes the water and the surrounding air to cool as some of the water evaporates. Passive ventilation may be used to maximize the flow of unsaturated air over the water surface and carry the cooled air to where it is needed in the building. Salasabils are often used with windcatchers. 

A salsabil may also be used to aerate water for drinking in a sabil (or sebil). Salsabils, in the form of inclined marble slabs over which drinking water flowed before being dispensed, were often included inside the sabils of Mamluk architecture. 

Salasabils were used in Mughal architecture from the 1200s to the 1600s. They were also used in recent centuries in Iran. They were sometimes used as decorative features in Ottoman domestic architecture.

See also
Passive cooling

References

Arabic words and phrases
Passive cooling
Passive ventilation
Water treatment